is a 1999 Japanese video game released for the Sony PlayStation. It is a three-dimensional action-adventure game that was developed by Talon Inc. and published by Sammy. The story focuses on a counter-terrorist unit known as INTER-ANTS (International Anti-terrorist Service).

Gameplay 
The game is set in 2001, when a terrorist organization known as Hephaestus has risen, with the aforementioned INTER-ANTS being formed as a response to combat them.

Deep Freeze is an action adventure game. All the characters act in teams. At the beginning of each mission, players can pick one of five characters who will play as a partner and provide cover fire. This computer-controlled partner can be controlled through simple commands.

The game features many weapons the player can choose from the start, including a shotgun, Uzi submachine gun, and magnum handgun. Players can also collect grenades in the game, which can flush out enemies hidden behind obstacles such as barrels. The player can also perform rolls, which allows them to dodge bullets from enemies.

Despite being released in Japan only, the game features English voice acting. However, all the menus in the game are in Japanese.

The game uses pre-rendered backgrounds and camera switching in a similar fashion to the game Resident Evil.

Release 
The game was shown at the 2000 Tokyo Games Show gaming convention in Japan. The publisher, Sammy, was more well known at the time for developing pachinko games.

Deep Freeze was released on January 14, 1999, for the Sony PlayStation home console, and was published by Sammy. The game was re-released on July 19, 2000, in the SuperLite 1500 budget line of games. The game has never been released outside of Japan, nor has it ever been released on the PlayStation Network game archives either.

Reception 

The game received mostly positive reviews upon release. Famitsu gave the game a score of 26 out of 40. Ralph Karels writing in the German video game magazine Video Games gave it a 75 out of 100. He recommended the game for fans of Resident Evil series, and those who like import games. However, he cautioned that knowledge of Japanese is needed to complete the game because the menus are in Japanese. Super Gamepower gave it a score of 4 out of 5 in all categories (sound, graphics, fun, control) and an overall score of 4 out of 5. The writer described the game as like Resident Evil, with more action and shooting but less blood and gore.

Mega Fun gave it a 78.

Gamers' Republic gave the game a score of C and was rather critical of it. The writer says that the mixture of fast action and pre-rendered backgrounds does not mix and causes disorientation. The writer explained that such a format worked for Resident Evil since it was slower paced, it doesn't work in Deep Freeze. Also, the writer commented on the voice acting, calling it "horrendous" and said the enemy AI was too passive for simply standing there while the player reloaded.

See also 
 Hard Edge

References 

1999 in video gaming
Action-adventure games
Japan-exclusive video games
PlayStation (console) games
PlayStation (console)-only games
Sammy games
Single-player video games
Terrorism in fiction
Third-person shooters
Video games developed in Japan